The Kawanishi H8K was a flying boat used by the Imperial Japanese Navy Air Service during World War II for maritime patrol duties. The Allied reporting name for the type was "Emily".

The Kawanishi H8K was a large, four-engine aircraft designed for long range and extended endurance on patrols or bombing missions typically flown alone over the ocean. The prototype first flew in January 1941, and H8K1s made their first combat sortie in March 1942. The robust H8K2 "Emily" flying boat was also fitted with powerful defensive armament, for which Allied pilots had substantial respect wherever this aircraft was encountered in the Pacific theater. Aircraft historian René Francillon called the H8K "the most outstanding water-based combat aircraft of the Second World War."

Design and development
At the same time the type's predecessor, the Kawanishi H6K, was entering service in 1938 the Navy ordered the development of a larger, longer-ranged patrol aircraft under the designation Navy Experimental 13-Shi Large-size Flying Boat. The result was a large, shoulder-winged design that is widely regarded as the best flying boat of the war. Despite this, initial development was troublesome, with the prototype displaying terrible handling on the water. Deepening of the hull, redesigning of the planing bottom and the addition of spray strips under the nose rectified the water handling problems. Two further prototypes — actually pre-production aircraft — joined the development program in December 1941.

The IJNAS accepted the first production version as the H8K1, Navy Type 2 Flying Boat, Model 11, of which 14 would be built.

The improved H8K2 variant soon appeared, and its extremely heavy defensive armament earned it deep respect among Allied aircrews. The H8K2 was an upgrade over the H8K1 with more powerful engines, slightly revised armament, and an increase in fuel capacity. This was to be the definitive variant, with 112 produced.

36 examples of a dedicated transport version, the H8K2-L, were also built, capable of carrying 62 troops. This aircraft was also known as Seikū (晴空, "Clear Sky"). The side defensive blisters, ventral defensive hatch, and dorsal turret were discarded. To increase the available space within the aircraft its hull tanks were removed, thus reducing its range.

Operational history

The H8K entered production in 1941 and first saw operational use on the night of 4 March 1942 in a second raid on Pearl Harbor. Two planes from the Yokohama Kōkūtai (Naval Air Corps) attempted to bomb Pearl Harbor but, due to poor visibility, did not accomplish any significant damage.

Six days after the second Pearl Harbor raid, one of the Emilys was sent on a daylight photo-reconnaissance mission of Midway Atoll. It was intercepted by radar-directed Brewster F2A Buffalo fighters of Marine Fighting Squadron 221 (VMF-221) and shot down. All aboard were killed, including Lt. Hashizume Hisao, the lead pilot of the second Pearl Harbor raid.

H8K2s were used on a wide range of patrol, reconnaissance, bombing, and transport missions throughout the Pacific War. The H8K2 was given the Allied code name "Emily".

Variants

H8K1 Experimental Type 13 Large-sized Flying boat (13試大型飛行艇 13-Shi Ōgata Hikōtei)
 One prototype and four supplementary prototypes. Prototype was mounted Mitsubishi Mk4A Kasei 11 engines, supplementary prototype was mounted Mitsubishi MK4B Kasei 12 engines. Supplementary prototypes were renamed Type 2 Flying Boat Model 11 on 5 February 1942. Prototype was rebuilt to H8K1-L in November 1943.
H8K1 Type 2 Flying boat, Model 11 (二式飛行艇11型 Nishiki Hikōtei 11-gata)
Developed on 5 February 1942. First operative model of series, 12 produced. Mounted Mitsubishi MK4B Kasei 12 engines.
H8K1-L Type 2 Transport Flying Boat (二式輸送艇 Nishiki Yusōtei)
Rebuilt from H8K1 prototype. Fitted augment exhausts. Up to 41 passengers.
H8K2 Type 2 Flying boat, Model 12 (二式飛行艇12型 Nishiki Hikōtei 12-gata)
Developed on 26 June 1943. Mounted Mitsubishi MK4Q Kasei 22 engines and improved tail gun turret. Latter batch was equipped with Air-Surface Vessel (ASV) search radar, and removed side gun blisters. 112 produced.
H8K2-L Seikū ("Clear Sky"), Model 32 (晴空32型 Seikū 32-gata)
Transport version of H8K2. Initial named Type 2 Transport Flying Boat, Model 32. Armaments were 1 × forward-firing 20 mm cannon and 1 × rearward-firing 13 mm machine gun. Up to 64 passengers.
H8K3 Provisional name Type 2 Flying Boat, Model 22 (仮称二式飛行艇22型 Kashō Nishiki Hikōtei 22-gata)
Experimental version, H8K2 modified. Equipped with retractable floats in wingtips, Fowler flaps, sliding hatch side gun locations in place of the blisters and a retractable dorsal turret, all in an effort to increase speed; two prototypes only (work number 596 and 597).
H8K4 Provisional name Type 2 Flying Boat, Model 23 (仮称二式飛行艇23型 Kashō Nishiki Hikōtei 23-gata)
H8K3 re-engined with 1,825 hp MK4T Mitsubishi Kasei 25b engines, two converted from H8K3.
H8K4-L Provisional name Seikū, Model 33 (仮称晴空33型 Kashō Seikū 33-gata)
Transport version of H8K4. Only a project, because all H8K4s were lost in March 1945. 
G9K 
Proposed land-based attack bomber variant, only a project.

Operators
 Japan
Imperial Japanese Navy Air Service
Saeki Kōkutai
Sasebo Kōkutai
Takuma Kōkutai
Yokohama Kōkutai
Yokosuka Kōkutai
14th Kōkutai
801st Kōkutai
802nd Kōkutai
851st Kōkutai
901st Kōkutai
902nd Kōkutai
951st Kōkutai
1001st Kōkutai
1021st Kōkutai
1081st Kōkutai
Miscellaneous
Yokosuka Naval District
11th Naval Air Arsenal
11th Air Fleet
Kamikaze
Azusa group (picked from 801st Kōkutai, guidance only)

Surviving aircraft

Four aircraft survived until the end of the war. One of these, an H8K2 (work number 426), was captured by U.S. forces at the end of the war and was evaluated before being eventually returned to Japan in 1979. It was on display at Tokyo's Museum of Maritime Science until 2004, when it was moved to Kanoya Air Base Museum at Kanoya Air Field in Kagoshima.

The submerged remains of an H8K can be found off the west coast of Saipan, where it is a popular scuba diving attraction known erroneously as the "B-29", or the "Emily". Another wrecked H8K lies in Chuuk Lagoon, Chuuk, in Micronesia. This aircraft is located off the south-western end of Dublon Island.

Specifications (Kawanishi H8K2)

See also

References

Notes

Bibliography
 Francillon, René J. Japanese Aircraft of the Pacific War. London: Putnam & Company, 1970 (2nd edition 1979). .
 

 
 
 
Famous Airplanes of the World, No. 49 Type 2 Flying Boat, Bunrindō (Japan), November 1994.
The Maru Mechanic, No. 19 Feature, Type 2 Flying Boat, Ushio Shobō (Japan), November 1979.
 Model Art No. 541, Special issue Type 2 Flying Boat and Imperial Japanese Navy Flying Boats, Model Art Co. Ltd., July 1999.

H8K
H8K, Kawanishi
Flying boats
Four-engined tractor aircraft
Shoulder-wing aircraft
World War II Japanese patrol aircraft
Aircraft first flown in 1941
Four-engined piston aircraft